Cirklar is a 1998 CajsaStina Åkerström studio album.

Track listing
All lyrics and music by CajsaStina Åkerström
Cirklar – 3:17
Vänd dig om – 4:29
Revansch – 4:19
Skärvor – 4:06
Rytm – 3:59
Släck ljuset och kom – 4:37
Två – 4:54
Lågtryck – 3:52
Nu – 4:04
Vintermörker (kom, kom, kom) – 3:04

Contributors
CajsaStina Åkerström – vocals
Kristoffer Wallman, Niklas Medin –keyboard
Henrik Jansson, Lars Halapi, Matias Thorell  –guitar
Sture Lindvall – bass
Magnus Frykberg – drums

Chart positions

References

1998 albums
CajsaStina Åkerström albums